Proposition 26 is a California ballot proposition on the general election on November 8, 2022 that would have allowed in-person sports gambling at tribal casinos and horse racetracks, as well as additional gambling games such as craps and roulette at tribal casinos.

A Native American tribe’s authority to offer such games would need to be negotiated with the state.

References

2022 California ballot propositions
Sports betting